The Challenger is the name of different fictional characters appearing in American comic books published by Marvel Comics.

The William Waring version of Challenger appeared beginning with the company's 1940s iteration as Timely Comics during the period fans and historians call the Golden Age of Comic Books.

Publication history
The Challenger was a weapons master, who challenged opponents to fight using a weapon of their choice. He was inspired by the death of his father, who was killed by underworld criminals, to travel around the world and become an expert wielding 1,000 different weapons. This includes chemistry, "nerve control", and flying a plane. Comics historian Jim Steranko called this "one of the weakest stories ever told".

The Challenger first appeared in Daring Mystery Comics #7 (April 1941) from Marvel Comics predecessor Timely Comics, debuting in both a two-page text story, "The Valley of Time", by writer Ray Gill, and in the 12-page comics story "Meet the Challenger", by Mike Sekowsky and George Klein, under the pseudonym "Nick Karlton". Following this issue, Daring Mystery Comics took a nine-month hiatus, and the Challenger moved over to Mystic Comics.

In Mystic Comics, the Challenger appeared in issues #6-10 (Oct. 1941-Aug. 1942), in eight- to nine-page stories by artists including Al Bare and Sekowsky. In at least one instance, the Challenger story was written by Stan Lee ("Horror Mansion", Mystic Comics #9, May 1942).

The Challenger was not chosen to appear with his Timely compatriots in the 1976 Golden Age nostalgia team, the Liberty Legion. Legion creator Roy Thomas considered including the Challenger in the new team, but decided against it: "The Challenger was a really great character that nobody ever did much with because his motif was that he would challenge a villain to fight him with a weapon of the villain's choice, and he would beat him. That might be a limited gimmick, but it was an interesting gimmick and it made him a unique kind of character. However, it didn't necessarily lend itself very well to being in a group, because he wouldn't have the scope to do his main shtick in a group the way that he would in a solo story".

The Challenger first appears in a modern-day story in She-Hulk #11 (March 2005), having "bounced forward" in time.

In 2008, the Challenger is called into service during the Fifty State Initiative to lead the Freedom Force, Montana's state superteam.

The demon version of Challenger first appeared in Ghost Rider vol. 2 #17 and was created by Tony Isabella and Frank Robbins.

The Elder of the Universe version of Challenger first appeared in The Avengers #678 and was created by Mark Waid, Al Ewing, Jim Zub, and Pepe Larraz.

Fictional character biography

William Waring
Former law student William "Bill" Waring, having traveled around the world to learn skills needed to avenge his father's murder for turning state's evidence over to the district attorney, dons a green costume with a full face mask to become the World War II superhero the Challenger.

Through unexplained circumstances, the Challenger "bounced forward" in time to the present day, finding himself without assets, having been presumed dead, and inquiring of the law firm Goodman, Lieber, Kurtzberg & Holliway about reversing his will. The firm puts him in contact with the superhero Captain America, who had found himself in a future era due to suspended animation, for advice and assistance. He later becomes part of the federal government's Fifty State Initiative of superhero teams, joining the Montana group, Freedom Force.

Demon version
The Challenger is a demon that works as an agent of Mephisto. He was dispatched by Mephisto to drag Ghost Rider to Hell. At the time when Ghost Rider and Daimon Hellstrom were exorcising Legion from the body of Katy Milner, the Challenger appeared and challenged the Ghost Rider to a deadly race for the fate of Katy. Though he defeated Ghost Rider, the Challenger was hit by Ghost Rider's hellfire attack which caused the spell to be broken, revealing Katy Milner as the cursed form of Roxanne Simpson

Peter Parker

At the time when the Avengers and the New Avengers got displaced to the World War II-era and collaborated with the Invaders, Peter Parker sported a green costume and took up the alias of the Challenger when fighting Red Skull and the Nazis.

Elder of the Universe
An earlier member of the Elders of the Universe originally went by the name of the Grandmaster until he lost it in a contest against En Dwi Gast whom he shared a gaming hobby with. This Elder was banished to the void of nothingness until the end of time. After the Multiverse was recreated following the end of the "Secret Wars" storyline, the Elder returned and took up the name of the Challenger where he challenged the Grandmaster to a rematch.

With Earth as the battleground, the Challenger reassembled the Black Order to the point where he resurrected Black Dwarf, Corvus Glaive, Proxima Midnight, and restored Supergiant as a psychic projection. The Challenger pitted them against the Grandmaster's incarnation of the Lethal Legion. One of the challenges involved gathering the Pyramoids that were in different locations.

When it came to the final round, the Challenger had an ace up his sleeve in the form of a resurrected Hulk. When the Hulk destroyed the Pyramoid that was in Voyager's possession at the Avengers Auxiliary Headquarters, it cost the Challenger the victory he needed. Afterward, they both heard Voyager's confession to the Avengers for her involvement with the Grandmaster. Before the Grandmaster can offer him a rematch, the Challenger apparently disintegrated him and made plans to destroy Earth under the alias of Grandmaster Prime. He fought off Falcon, Hulk, Rogue, and Wonder Man until Voyager arrived with an army of Avengers to fight Challenger. Voyager's morale boost and power augmentation from Scarlet Witch enabled the Challenger to be defeated. Voyager then took the Challenger back to the Far Shore and shackled him to observe the Avengers' subsequent adventures where Voyager hoped that they can inspire him like they did with her. Challenger agreed to watch the Avengers until the day he is able to break free.

Powers and abilities
The William Waring version of Challenger is a master of weapons, jiu-jitsu, chemistry, and swordsmanship. He is also a skilled marksman, boxer, and pilot. Through Indian nerve-control training, the Challenger gained the superpower to make himself immune to pain at will.

The Elder of the Universe version of Challenger possesses the Primordial Power which enables him to have super-strength, enhanced durability, immortality, energy manipulation, and the apparent ability to resurrect the dead.

References

External links
 
 All-New Official Handbook of the Marvel Universe A-Z #2 (2006)

Comics characters introduced in 1941
Elders of the Universe
Fictional swordfighters in comics
Fictional World War II veterans
Golden Age superheroes
Marvel Comics demons
Marvel Comics extraterrestrial supervillains
Marvel Comics male superheroes
Marvel Comics martial artists
Marvel Comics superheroes
Marvel Comics supervillains
Timely Comics characters